The rumen, also known as a paunch, is the largest stomach compartment in ruminants and the larger part of the reticulorumen, which is the first chamber in the alimentary canal of ruminant animals. The rumen's microbial favoring environment allows it to serve as the primary site for microbial fermentation of ingested feed. The smaller part of the reticulorumen is the reticulum, which is fully continuous with the rumen, but differs from it with regard to the texture of its lining.

Brief anatomy 

The rumen is composed of several muscular sacs, the cranial sac, ventral sac, ventral blindsac, and reticulum.

The lining of the rumen wall is covered in small fingerlike projections called papillae, which are flattened, approximately 5mm in length and 3mm wide in cattle. The reticulum is lined with ridges that form a hexagonal honeycomb pattern. The ridges are approximately 0.1–0.2mm wide and are raised 5mm above the reticulum wall. The hexagons in the reticulum are approximately 2–5 cm wide in cattle. These features increase the surface area of the reticulorumen wall, facilitating the absorption of volatile fatty acids. Despite the differences in the texture of the lining of the two parts of the reticulorumen, it represents one functional space.

Digestion 
Digestion in the reticulorumen is a complex process.  Digestion occurs through fermentation by microbes in the reticulorumen rather than the animal per se.  The reticulorumen is one of the few organs present in animals in which digestion of cellulose and other recalcitrant carbohydrates can proceed to any appreciable degree.

The main substrates of digestion in the reticulorumen are non-structural carbohydrates (starch, sugar, and pectin), structural carbohydrates (hemicellulose and cellulose), and nitrogen-containing compounds (proteins, peptides, and amino acids). Both non-structural and structural carbohydrates are hydrolysed to monosaccharides or disaccharides by microbial enzymes.  The resulting mono- and disaccharides are transported into the microbes.  Once within microbial cell walls, the mono- and disaccharides  may be assimilated into microbial biomass or fermented to volatile fatty acids (VFAs) acetate, propionate, butyrate, lactate, valerate and other branched-chain VFAs via glycolysis and other biochemical pathways to yield energy for the microbial cell.  Most VFAs are absorbed across the reticulorumen wall, directly into the blood stream, and are used by the ruminant as substrates for energy production and biosynthesis. Some branched chained VFAs are incorporated into the lipid membrane of rumen microbes.  Protein is hydrolysed to peptides and amino acids by microbial enzymes, which are subsequently transported across the microbial cell wall for assimilation into cell biomass, primarily.  Peptides, amino acids, ammonia, and other sources of nitrogen originally present in the feed can also be used directly by microbes with little to no hydrolysis.  Non-amino acid nitrogen is used for synthesis of microbial amino acids.  In situations in which nitrogen for microbial growth is in excess, protein and its derivatives can also be fermented to produce energy, yielding ammonia.

Lipids, lignin, minerals, and vitamins play a less prominent role in digestion than carbohydrates and protein, but they are still critical in many ways. Lipids are partly hydrolysed and hydrogenated, and glycerol, if present in the lipid, is fermented. Lipids are otherwise inert in the rumen. Some carbon from carbohydrate or protein may be used for de novo synthesis of microbial lipid.  High levels of lipid, particularly unsaturated lipid, in the rumen are thought to poison microbes and suppress fermentation activity. Lignin, a phenolic compound, is recalcitrant to digestion, through it can be solubilized by fungi. Lignin is thought to shield associated nutrients from digestion and hence limits degradation. Minerals are absorbed by microbes and are necessary to their growth.  Microbes in turn synthesize many vitamins, such as cyanocobalamin, in great quantities—often great enough to sustain the ruminant even when vitamins are highly deficient in the diet.

Stratification and mixing of digesta 
Digested food (digesta) in the rumen is not uniform, but rather stratified into gas, liquid, and particles of different sizes, densities, and other physical characteristics. Additionally, the digesta is subject to extensive mixing and complicated flow paths upon entry into the rumen. Though they may seem trivial at first, these complicated stratification, mixing, and flow patterns of digesta are a key aspect of digestive activity in the ruminant and thus warrant detailed discussion.

After being swallowed, food travels down the oesophagus and is deposited in the dorsal part of the reticulum. Contractions of the reticulorumen propel and mix the recently ingested feed into the ruminal mat.  The mat is a thick mass of digesta, consisting of partially degraded, long, fibrous material.  Most material in the mat has been recently ingested, and as such, has considerable fermentable substrate remaining.  Microbial fermentation proceeds rapidly in the mat, releasing many gases.  Some of these gases are trapped in the mat, causing the mat to be buoyant.  As fermentation proceeds, fermentable substrate is exhausted, gas production decreases, and particles lose buoyancy due to loss of entrapped gas.  Digesta in the mat hence goes through a phase of increasing buoyancy followed by decreasing buoyancy.  Simultaneously, the size of digesta particles–relatively large when ingested–is reduced by microbial fermentation and, later, rumination. Incomplete digestion of plant material here will result in the formation of a type of bezoar called Phytobezoars. At a certain point, particles are dense and small enough that they may “fall” through the rumen mat into the ventral sac below, or they may be swept out of the rumen mat into the reticulum by liquid gushing through the mat during ruminal contractions. Once in the ventral sac, digesta continues to ferment at decreased rates, further losing buoyancy and decreasing in particle size.  It is soon swept into the ventral reticulum by ruminal contractions.

In the ventral reticulum, less dense, larger digesta particles may be propelled up into the oesophagus and mouth during contractions of the reticulum.  Digesta is chewed in the mouth in a process known as rumination, then expelled back down the oesophagus and deposited in the dorsal sac of the reticulum, to be lodged and mixed into the ruminal mat again.  Denser, small particles stay in the ventral reticulum during reticular contraction, and then during the next contraction may be swept out of the reticulorumen with liquid through the reticulo-omasal orifice, which leads to the next chamber in the ruminant animal's alimentary canal, the omasum.

Water and saliva enter through the rumen to form a liquid pool.  Liquid will ultimately escape from the reticulorumen from absorption through the wall, or through passing through the reticulo-omasal orifice, as digesta does.  However, since liquid cannot be trapped in the mat as digesta can, liquid passes through the rumen much more quickly than digesta does.  Liquid often acts as a carrier for very small digesta particles, such that the dynamics of small particles is similar to that of liquid.

The uppermost area of the rumen, the headspace, is filled with gases (such as methane, carbon dioxide, and, to a much lower degree, hydrogen) released from fermentation and anaerobic respiration of food. These gases are regularly expelled from the reticulorumen through the mouth, in a process called eructation.

Reticulorumenal microbes 

Microbes in the reticulorumen include bacteria, protozoa, fungi, archaea, and viruses. Bacteria, along with protozoa, are the predominant microbes and by mass account for 40-60% of total microbial matter in the rumen. They are categorized into several functional groups, such as fibrolytic, amylolytic, and proteolytic types, which preferentially digest structural carbohydrates, non-structural carbohydrates, and protein, respectively. Protozoa (40-60% of microbial mass) derive their nutrients through phagocytosis of other microbes, and degrade and digest feed carbohydrates, especially starch and sugars, and protein.  Although protozoa are not essential for rumen functioning, their presence has pronounced effects.  Ruminal fungi make up only 5-10% of microbes and are absent on diets poor in fibre.  Despite their low numbers, the fungi still occupy an important niche in the rumen because they hydrolyse some ester linkages between lignin and hemicellulose or cellulose, and help break down digesta particles.  Rumen Archaea, approximately 3% of total microbes, are mostly autotrophic methanogens and produce methane through anaerobic respiration.  Most of the hydrogen produced by bacteria, protozoa and fungi is used by these methanogens to reduce carbon dioxide to methane.  The maintenance of low partial pressure of hydrogen by methanogens is essential for proper functioning of the rumen. Viruses are present in unknown numbers and do not contribute to any fermentation or respiration activity.  However, they do lyse microbes, releasing their contents for other microbes to assimilate and ferment in a process called microbial recycling, although recycling through the predatory activities of protozoa is quantitatively more important.

Microbes in the reticulorumen eventually flow out into the omasum and the remainder of the alimentary canal.  Under normal fermentation conditions the environment in the reticulorumen is weakly acidic and is populated by microbes that are adapted to a pH between roughly 5.5 and 6.5; since the abomasum is strongly acidic (pH 2 to 4), it acts as a barrier that largely kills reticulorumen flora and fauna as they flow into it.  Subsequently, microbial biomass is digested in the small intestine and smaller molecules (mainly amino acids) are absorbed and transported in the portal vein to the liver.  The digestion of these microbes in the small intestine is a major source of nutrition, as microbes usually supply some 60 to 90% of the total amount of amino acids absorbed. On starch-poor diets, they also provide the predominant source of glucose absorbed from the small intestinal contents.

Ruminal Acidosis: In cattle the ruminal acidosis is characterized by the decreased blood pH and bicarbonate due to the over production of ruminal D-lactate. It can appear as acute rumen acidosis due to lactic acid accumulation to sub-acute acidosis due to accumulation of VFAs in the rumen, although acute acidosis is more fatal than sub-acute rumen acidosis. The decrease in ciliated protozoal population of the ruminal fluid is a common feature of both acidosis and can be a good indicator of the ruminal acidosis. This leads to rapid fermentation of the organic substrates contributing to massive formation of VFAs and lactic acids leading to lower pH and subsequent reactions by the microbes of rumen.

Major differences between the two clinical forms of acidosis:

.

Human uses 
The feed contained within the reticulorumen, known as "paunch waste", has been studied as a fertiliser for use in sustainable agriculture.

Rumen development 
At birth, the rumen organ, rumen epithelium, and rumen microbiota are not fully developed. Developing the rumen after birth is a critical aspect of the overall development of ruminants. This early, sensitive period of rumen development, will have life-lasting effects on the overall health and productivity of the animal. Generally, the most receptive time for rumen development is between the postnatal and weaning periods. Over this period, rumen organ and epithelium growth, along with the establishment of rumen microbiota, will prove to be essential to rumen development.

Papillae, or small, round projections protruding out of the tissue lining, growth in rumen epithelium is essential for rumen functionality. Papillae increase the surface area inside of the rumen. Therefore, papillae allow for a considerable increase in nutrient absorption inside of the rumen. Distinguishing a developed from an undeveloped rumen is simplified by observing the carpeting of tissue surrounding the interior of the rumen. An undeveloped rumen maintains a smooth, papillae-lacking outer surface. A developed rumen possesses thick, papillae-full walls.

Due to ruminants being born with a sterile gastrointestinal tract, the developing rumen must be exposed to an array of microflora at an early stage. This is why a specific diet in which microflora that promote an anaerobic environment in the rumen are favored. Furthermore, feeds must be tailored to the needs of the specific ruminants. Developing ruminants who have been on a strict liquid feed diet will possess different microflora when compared to that of a developing ruminant fed with a combination of a dry and liquid feed. This is due to the nutrients ingested by the animal not entering into the rumen stomach compartment, as it is instead bypassed by the reflexive closure of the esophageal groove.

The most abundant bacteria present in the rumen microbiome include Prevotella, Butyrivibrio, and Ruminococcus. This is due to ruminant organisms ingesting high-forage, commonly grass-based diets. Their typical high-forage diets cause this significant demand for cellulose digesting bacteria to be ever-present. Other bacteria, such as Lachnospira multiparus, Prevotella ruminicola, and Butyrivibrio fibrisolvens, play essential roles in the creation of volatile fatty acids (VFAs). Specific feeds can stimulate this extensive bacterial growth in the rumen and therefore aid in the production of these volatile fatty acids, which play a major role in rumen epithelium growth, capillary development, and papillae formation. Previous research identified the significant impact of volatile fatty acids on rumen development through the effects of the inter-ruminal insertion of acetate, propionate, and butyrate. The most visually notable and impactful of these volatile fatty acids was butyrate, which is synthesized naturally in ruminants through multiple anaerobic fermentation pathways of dietary substrates. Butyrate, mainly expressed in epithelial tissue lining, is involved in regulating a plethora of ruminant epithelial cell genes. Generally, butyrate regulates gene expression by acting on cell cycle control pathways. In the epithelial wall of the rumen, butyrate regulates epithelial cell gene expression to increase blood flow and papilla proliferation.

Rumen microbiome genetics 
Developing feeds to support the microbiome growth of both production and pet ruminant animals is vital; both for the overall health of the maturing animal and for reducing the costs associated with raising that animal. In the production animal realm, feeding can account for up to 75% of the overall cost associated with that animal, making it crucial to identify and satisfy the nutritional demands of the rumen. Sampling microbial DNA from rumen epithelial cells has led to the identification of microbial genes and functional pathways associated with animal growth factors. Microbial clusters in the rumen possess genes associated with many animal growth-related factors. Protein encoding genes that encode for bacterial cell functions, such as aguA, ptb, K01188, and murD, also are associated with the animal’s average daily weight gain. Furthermore, vitamin B12 related genes, including cobD, tolC, and fliN, are also related to the daily feed intake of the animal.

References 

  
 

Digestive system
Ruminants
Mammal anatomy